The following is a list of envoys, ministers, and ambassadors that the United States has sent to Bolivia. As a point of note, the first Ambassador of the United States to Bolivia was John Appleton, who served as the charge d'Affaires from January 3, 1849, to May 4, 1849. Since September 15, 2008, there has been no official Ambassador with the office being held by a chargé d’Affaires.

List

See also
Bolivia – United States relations
Foreign relations of Bolivia
Ambassadors of the United States

Notes

References

United States Department of State: Background notes on Bolivia

External links
 United States Department of State: Chiefs of Mission for Bolivia
 United States Department of State: Bolivia
 United States Embassy in La Paz

Bolivia

United States